Pyrausta ochracealis is a moth in the family Crambidae. It was described by Francis Walker in 1866. It is found in Sri Lanka, India (Assam), Myanmar, Java and Sulawesi.

References

Moths described in 1866
ochracealis
Moths of Asia